Bucketheadland 2 is the tenth studio album by guitarist Buckethead. Released in 2003, it is a sequel to his debut album, Bucketheadland, a concept album about his fictional "abusement" park.

The album was nominated for the 2004 Shortlist Music Prize.

Track listing

Notes
"Frozen Brains Tell No Tales" uses the same recording of Bootsy Collins singing "Buckethead's a psycho, he's a total psycho" that is used in "Want Some Slaw?", from Buckethead's second album, "Giant Robot.
"Digger's Den" begins with Bootsy Collins exclaiming the phrase "Hit me", which would later be sampled for "Bird With a Hole in the Stomach" on Buckethead's 2006 album, The Elephant Man's Alarm Clock.
"Carpal Tunnel Tomb Torker" features Bootsy Collins shouting "I'm Cocoa for Cuckoo Puffs!", a reference to the Bucketheadland album in which he is similarly heard singing the jingle for Sugar Crisp cereal.
Elements of the tracks "Slaughter Zone Entrance" and "Slaughter Zone Exit" would later be used in "The Ravines of Falsehood" on Buckethead's 2004 album, The Cuckoo Clocks of Hell.
After an initial guitar riff, "Slaughter Zone Exit" consists primarily of silence, only permeated by a number of scattered samples, including many of the spoken word pieces heard throughout the album. A possible reason for this is that Buckethead wanted the longest track on the album to be exactly 8:16, matching the length of the longest track on Bucketheadland (Computer Master). This would make the two longest tracks from his debut and its sequel the same length.

Credits
Per album liner notes
Taxidermy, production, 6-string wedge & pieces by Buckethead
Co-produced, co-written, mixed, engineered and programmed by Dan Monti
Recorded at the Coop & the Del Rey Brewer Factory
Voices: Bootsy Collins, Li'l Littles, Keystone Brewer, Bill Monti [the Towel], P-Sticks, Albert
Additional drums: Brain
Mechanical morgue: Dead
Ferris Wheel [Page 1]: P-Sticks
Artwork, dialogue & research: Bryan Theiss for Frankenseuss Animatronics
Buckethead memorabilia courtesy of the Ronald L. Witherspoon Collection
Special thanks: Bootsy, Norm, Li'l Littles, Keystone Brewer, Bill the Towel, P-Sticks, Brain, Dan Monti, Frankenseuss
Executive producer: Norman Isaacs

References

2003 albums
Buckethead albums
Sequel albums